Pierre Borel (c. 1620 – 1671) was a French savant: a chemist (and reputed alchemist), physician, and botanist.

Borel was born in Castres.  He became a doctor of medicine at the University of Montpellier in 1640. In 1654 he became physician to the King of France, Louis XIV.

In 1663 he married Esther de Bonnafous. In 1674 he became a member of the Académie française.  He died in Paris.

He concerned himself with an eclectic range of subjects: optics, ancient history, philology and bibliography. His biographers have tended to deplore his spreading of himself over so many areas.

In The Case of Charles Dexter Ward, H. P. Lovecraft (mis)represents Borellus (sic) as a potent necromancer. In fact, the novels opens with a quote from Borellus.

Works
 Les antiquités de Castres, 1649 
 Bibliotheca chimica, 1654 
 Trésor de recherches et d'antiquités gauloises et françaises, 1655 
 Historiarium et observationum medico-physicarum centuria IV, 1653, 1656 
 De vero telescopii inventore, 1655.
 Vitae Renati Cartesii, summi philosophi compendium, 1656.
 Discours nouveau prouvant la pluralité des mondes, 1657.

Notes

References
Marie-Rose Carré, A Man between Two Worlds: Pierre Borel and His Discours nouveau prouvant la pluralité des mondes of 1657, Isis, Vol. 65, No. 3 (Sep., 1974), pp. 322–335
Pierre Chabbert, Pierre Borel (1620 ?-1671), Revue d’histoire des sciences 21 (1968), 303-43.

External links
 Didier Foucault, Pierre Borel 



1620 births
1689 deaths
People from Castres
French archaeologists
French naturalists
17th-century French chemists
17th-century antiquarians